Gary Middlehurst (born 24 October 1983) is an English rugby league footballer who plays as a loose forward for the Rochdale Hornets in the Betfred Championship.

Middlehurst signed for the North Wales Crusaders from the Rochdale Hornets after starting his career at Widnes. He also played one season for Oldham RLFC (Heritage № 1355).

References

External links
Rochdale Hornets profile

1983 births
Living people
English rugby league players
North Wales Crusaders players
Oldham R.L.F.C. players
Rochdale Hornets players
Rugby league locks
Rugby league players from Widnes
Widnes Vikings players